Edendale is the Norwegian rock band BigBang's seventh studio album (tenth in total), and the second album released to the American market. It was released on March 9, 2009 in Norway and in the U.S. on January 19, 2010. It was produced by Øystein Greni and Greg Richling of The Wallflowers.

Overview
The album is named for a district north west of downtown Los Angeles, presently known as Echo Park and the eastern part of Silver Lake. It was generally received positively by critics.

Track listing
"Play Louder"
"Call Me"
"Swedish Television"
"Isabel"
"Freeway Flowers"
"Bag of Leaves"
"To The Max"
"Jumpsuit"
"Now Is Not a Good Time"
"One Step at a Time"
"Something Special" (U.S. bonus track)
"Falling" (U.S. bonus track)
"Wild Bird" (U.S. bonus track)

References

External links

2009 albums
Bigbang (Norwegian band) albums
Oglio Records albums
Albums recorded at Sound City Studios